Cəmilli (also, Dzhamilli and Dzhamily) is a village and municipality in the Tartar Rayon of Azerbaijan.  It has a population of 1,520.

References 

Populated places in Tartar District